Jere Pulli (born June 17, 1991) is a Finnish ice hockey defenceman. He is currently a free agent having last played for HC Košice in the Slovak Extraliga.

Pulli made his SM-liiga debut playing with SaiPa during the 2010–11 season.

References

External links

1991 births
Living people
Kazzinc-Torpedo players
HC Košice players
MHC Martin players
Mikkelin Jukurit players
Rødovre Mighty Bulls players
SaiPa players
HC TPS players
Finnish ice hockey defencemen
People from Lappeenranta
Sportspeople from South Karelia
Finnish expatriate ice hockey players in Slovakia
Finnish expatriate ice hockey players in Kazakhstan
Finnish expatriate ice hockey players in Hungary
Finnish expatriate ice hockey players in Denmark